Gonialosa is a genus of gizzard shads that are found in the rivers of South and Southeast Asia.  There are currently three described species.

Species
 Gonialosa manmina (F. Hamilton, 1822) (Ganges river gizzard shad)
 Gonialosa modesta (F. Day, 1870) (Burmese river gizzard shad)
 Gonialosa whiteheadi Wongratana, 1983 (Southern Burmese river gizzard shad)

References
 

Clupeidae
Fish of Asia
Freshwater fish genera
Taxa named by Charles Tate Regan